The Chris August discography is about the works of Christian Contemporary-R&B musician Chris August.

Albums

Studio

Extended plays
 2007: Nice to Meet You
 2014: The Christmas EP
 2018: What You're Looking For - EP
 2019: Everything After EP

Independent 
 2004: A Beautiful Thing
 2007: What You're Looking For

Singles

Compilation appearances
WOW Hits 2014 - "Restore" (from The Upside of Down)
WOW Hits 2013 - "Center of It" (from The Upside of Down), He Said (Group 1 Crew featuring Chris August from Fearless) (2012)
Word: Six Decades Of Hits - "Starry Night" (from No Far Away) (2011)
WOW Christmas (2011) - "Come Now Our King" (2011)
WOW Hits 2012 - "Starry Night" (from No Far Away) (2011)
Artists in Adoration: 15 Worship Songs from your favorite Christian Artists - "Forever Reign" (2011)
Come Now Our King - EP - "Come Now Our King" (from No Far Away (Christmas Edition)) (2010)
WOW Hits 2011 - "Starry Night" (from No Far Away) (2010)
Song DISCovery Vol. 86 - "Starry Night" (from No Far Away) (2010)
WOW New & Next - "Battle" (from No Far Away) (2010)

Guest appearances

Awards
GMA Dove Awards

References

August, Chris
August, Chris